David House (1922–2012) is a British Army officer.

David House may also refer to:

Dave House, English singer/songwriter
Leopold David House, Anchorage, Alaska, listed on the National Register of Historic Places in Anchorage, Alaska
William David House, Shawhan, Kentucky, listed on the NRHP in Bourbon County, Kentucky

See also

House of David (disambiguation)
David

House, David